Asimoneura stroblii is a species of tephritid or fruit flies in the genus Trypeta of the family Tephritidae.

Distribution
France, Spain.

References

Tephritinae
Insects described in 1909
Diptera of Europe
Taxa named by Leander Czerny